Gornji Gradac may refer to the following places in Bosnia and Herzegovina:

Gornji Gradac, Konjic
Gornji Gradac, Široki Brijeg